Hazelhurst is an unincorporated community located in the town of Hazelhurst, Oneida County, Wisconsin, United States. Hazelhurst has a post office with ZIP code 54531.

History
Businessman Cyrus C. Yawkey started a sawmill in present-day Hazelhurst which became the Yawkey Lumber Company. Yawkey served on the Hazelhurst town board, the Oneida County board of supervisors, and the Wisconsin State Assembly.

Images

References

Unincorporated communities in Oneida County, Wisconsin
Unincorporated communities in Wisconsin